Trichacis is a genus of parasitoid wasps in the family Platygastridae. There are more than 60 described species in Trichacis.

Species
These 66 species belong to the genus Trichacis:

 Trichacis abdominalis Thomson, 1859
 Trichacis acarinata Arias-Penna & Masner
 Trichacis acuminata Arias-Penna & Masner
 Trichacis acuta Arias-Penna & Masner
 Trichacis afurcata Szabó, 1977
 Trichacis alticola Masner, 1983
 Trichacis ariaspennae Buhl, 2011
 Trichacis arizonensis (Ashmead, 1893)
 Trichacis bidentiscutum Szabó, 1981
 Trichacis bison Masner, 1983
 Trichacis celticola Masner, 1983
 Trichacis clypeata Arias-Penna & Masner
 Trichacis colombiana Arias-Penna & Masner
 Trichacis concavata Arias-Penna & Masner
 Trichacis cornicola (Ashmead, 1893)
 Trichacis cornuta Fouts, 1925
 Trichacis corrugata Arias-Penna & Masner
 Trichacis costaricana Arias-Penna & Masner
 Trichacis crossi MacGown, 1989
 Trichacis delsinnei Arias-Penna & Masner
 Trichacis denudata Buhl, 2001
 Trichacis depressa Arias-Penna & Masner
 Trichacis dianae Arias-Penna & Masner
 Trichacis didas (Walker, 1836)
 Trichacis dracula Masner, 1983
 Trichacis elongata Masner, 1983
 Trichacis fernandezi Arias-Penna & Masner
 Trichacis fusciala Szabó, 1981
 Trichacis hajduica Szabó, 1981
 Trichacis hansoni Arias-Penna & Masner
 Trichacis howensis Dodd, 1924
 Trichacis huberi Masner, 1983
 Trichacis hungarica Szabó, 1977
 Trichacis illusor Kieffer, 1916
 Trichacis indica Kieffer, 1907
 Trichacis kaulbarsi Arias-Penna & Masner
 Trichacis khajjiara Mani, 1975
 Trichacis laticornis Buhl, 2001
 Trichacis magnifica Arias-Penna & Masner
 Trichacis mahunkai Szabo, 1981
 Trichacis mandibulata Masner, 1983
 Trichacis meridionalis (Brues, 1910)
 Trichacis mexicana Arias-Penna & Masner
 Trichacis nosferatus Buhl, 1997
 Trichacis opaca Thomson, 1859
 Trichacis panamana Arias-Penna & Masner
 Trichacis pannonica Szabó, 1977
 Trichacis pecki Arias-Penna & Masner
 Trichacis pisis (Walker, 1836)
 Trichacis procera Arias-Penna & Masner
 Trichacis proximata Arias-Penna & Masner
 Trichacis pulchricornis Szelényi, 1953
 Trichacis punctata Arias-Penna & Masner
 Trichacis pyramidalis Masner, 1983
 Trichacis quadriclava Szabó, 1981
 Trichacis remulus (Walker, 1836)
 Trichacis rufipes Ashmead, 1893
 Trichacis sculpturata Arias-Penna & Masner
 Trichacis striata Masner, 1983
 Trichacis tatika Szabó, 1977
 Trichacis texana Fouts, 1925
 Trichacis transversata Arias-Penna & Masner
 Trichacis triangulata Arias-Penna & Masner
 Trichacis tristis (Nees von Esenbeck, 1834)
 Trichacis virginiensis Ashmead, 1893
 Trichacis vitreus Buhl, 1997

References

Further reading

 

Parasitic wasps
Articles created by Qbugbot
Platygastridae